Marisabel Rodríguez Oropeza (born 23 November 1964) is a Venezuelan journalist, publicist and radio announcer. She is best known for having been the second wife of former Venezuelan president Hugo Chávez.

Early life 
Rodríguez was born in Barquisimeto.

Career

Politics 
In 1999, Rodríguez was elected a member of the 1999 Constituent Assembly of Venezuela, in the process which wrote the present Constitution of Venezuela. She was elected with the second highest margin in the elections. She was then elected president of the Constituent Social Rights Commission and president of the Fundación del Niño, a state-funded foundation that works helping and supporting children throughout the country.

For almost two decades, Marisabel has been working in the area of social communications, especially public relations and as editor of the social section of El Impulso, one of the most important journals in midwest Venezuela.

Television and radio 
Rodríguez is an announcer and radio producer. She produced a magazine for children, "El Club de los Exploradores". She has anchored for television stations including Telecentro and Niños Cantores Televisión in her hometown of Barquisimeto. She has also produced the informative radio program "Líder en la Noticia".

Personal life
Her first marriage was to Allessandro Lanaro Pérezone, with whom she had a son.

She married Hugo Chavez in 1997. They had one daughter together, Rosines. In 2004 she and Chávez officially divorced, after 2 years of separation. In 2007, she publicly denounced the constitutional reforms proposed by Chávez.

She divorced her third husband in 2009, Félix Lisandro García, a tennis instructor.

See also

List of first ladies of Venezuela
Hugo Chavez

References

External links

1964 births
Living people
People from Barquisimeto
First Ladies of Venezuela
Chávez family
Members of the Venezuelan Constituent Assembly of 1999